A Gardener's Year is a 1905 non-fiction book from H. Rider Haggard.

References

External links
Complete book at Internet Archive

1905 non-fiction books
Works by H. Rider Haggard
Gardening books